Culture Collection University of Gothenburg (CCUG) is a Swedish microbial culture repository located in Gothenburg (Sweden) established by Enevold Falsen in 1968 and affiliated with the University of Gothenburg. The current curator is Prof. Dr. Edward R. B. Moore and it maintains bacterial, filamentous fungal and yeasts cultures, but it does not hold extremophiles and does not dispatch the most hazardous organisms classified in biosafety level 3. More than 73,000 strains of more than 4,500 species have so far been examined, whereof more than 21,000 are displayed on Internet. It represents the largest public collection of bacteria in Europe. The CCUG has been devoted to the identification of bacteria. The search engine is sophisticated and useful for clinical microbiologists who may check their diagnosis of an unusual species or order on-line a reference strain.

The CCUG also performs research and development of novel methods for rapid diagnosis of infectious diseases mainly by using molecular, genomic and proteomic approaches.

External links 
CCUG home page

News about the CCUG at Sveriges Radio

Microbiology organizations
University of Gothenburg
Culture collections
1968 establishments in Sweden
1968 in science
Organizations established in 1968